Dactyloctenium is a genus of Asian, African, and Australian plants in the grass family. There are about 13 species in the genus in the world, in which 3 are known to occur in India. A common name for the plants is crowfoot grasses.

Species
Dactyloctenium aristatum - East Africa, Arabian Peninsula; Indian Subcontinent
Dactyloctenium aegyptium – Egyptian grass - much of Africa; Asia from Turkey to Taiwan to Indonesia; various islands of Pacific + Indian Oceans; naturalized in Australia, the Americas, southern Europe; more Pacific Islands
Dactyloctenium australe – Durban grass - eastern + southern Africa; Madagascar
Dactyloctenium buchananensis - Queensland
Dactyloctenium capitatum - Madagascar
Dactyloctenium ctenoides - Kenya, Tanzania, Mozambique, Aldabra, Mauritius, Madagascar, Seychelles, Chagos Islands, etc.
Dactyloctenium germinatum – Sudan crowfoot grass - eastern + southern Africa; Madagascar; naturalized in Maryland, southern Mexico
Dactyloctenium giganteum - eastern + southern Africa; Madagascar; naturalized in Queensland
Dactyloctenium hackelii - Socotra
Dactyloctenium pilosum - Kenya, Aldabra, Seychelles, Madagascar
Dactyloctenium radulans – buttongrass - Australia
Dactyloctenium robecchii - Djibouti, Somalia, Socotra, Yemen, Oman
Dactyloctenium scindicum - East Africa, Arabian Peninsula, Indian Subcontinent; naturalized in Mexico

formerly included
see Acrachne, Eragrostis and Harpochloa 
 Dactyloctenium falcatum – Harpochloa falx 
 Dactyloctenium henrardianum – Acrachne henrardiana
 Dactyloctenium nitidum – Eragrostis nitida
 Dactyloctenium perrieri – Acrachne perrieri 
 Dactyloctenium verticillatum – Acrachne racemosa

References

External links
Jepson Manual Treatment
USDA Plants Profile
Grass Manual Treatment

 
Poaceae genera
Taxa named by Carl Ludwig Willdenow
Taxonomy articles created by Polbot